The 1905 Sewanee Tigers football team represented the Sewanee Tigers of Sewanee: The University of the South in the 1905 season.

Schedule

Players

Varsity lettermen

Line

Backfield

Subs

References

Sewanee
Sewanee Tigers football seasons
Sewanee Tigers football